The River Wingham is a tributary of the Little Stour in Kent, England.

The river runs from its source near Ash, west, through Wingham to the Little Stour.

References

Wingham
Dover District
2Wingham